The 19th season of the television series Arthur contains 10 episodes. These episodes were broadcast in early 2015 on CBBC in the UK, and aired on PBS in the US from June 2, 2015 to May 26, 2016. This season was produced along with season 18 in 2013, and is the last season to be animated by 9 Story Media Group with Adobe Flash, starting next season, Oasis Animation takes over, flash-animating it with Toon Boom Harmony. This is also the last season where William Healy voices Arthur, Andrew Dayton voices D.W., and Jacob Ewaniuk and Jake Sim voices the Tibble Twins.

Episodes

References

2015 American television seasons
2016 American television seasons
Arthur (TV series) seasons
2015 Canadian television seasons
2016 Canadian television seasons